Chico Marketplace, formerly Chico Mall, is an enclosed shopping mall in Chico, California. Opened in 1988, it features J. C. Penney and Dick's Sporting Goods as its anchor stores.

History
The mall opened in 1988. Its original anchor stores were Troutman's Emporium, Gottschalks, Longs Drugs, and Sears. Longs Drugs was soon converted to a J. C. Penney store, which moved from North Valley Plaza. As a result, Longs moved its store to Paradise. Upon opening, the mall had over 95 stores and cost more than $4 million to build.

Following the bankruptcy and closing of the Troutman's store, it was converted to Dick's Sporting Goods in 2012. Prior to this addition, original mall expansion plans instead called for demolishing the former Troutman's building, then home to a local furniture store, in favor of a new lifestyle center wing. 

After Gottschalks went out of business, its space became a Forever 21 store in 2009, which closed in 2020 as part of a plan to close 111 stores nationwide. 

Sears, the last remaining original anchor store, announced on June 6, 2017, that it would close the Chico Mall store in September 2017 as part of a plan to close 72 stores nationwide.

References

Shopping malls in California
Shopping malls established in 1988
Tourist attractions in Chico, California